Kang Deuk-Soo (Korean: 강득수) (born on January 1, 1961) is a South Korean football player and manager.

Club career statistics

Honours

Club 
Lucky-Goldstar Hwangso 
 K League (1) : 1985
 Korean National Football Championship (1) : 1988

Individual 
 K League Best XI : 1985
 K League Top Assists Award : 1986

References 
 Legends of K-League : 강득수 - 어시스트의 달인, 찬스메이커

External links 
 
 

1961 births
Living people
Association football midfielders
South Korean footballers
South Korea international footballers
FC Seoul players
Ulsan Hyundai FC players
K League 1 players
1986 FIFA World Cup players
Asian Games medalists in football
Footballers at the 1986 Asian Games
Asian Games gold medalists for South Korea
Medalists at the 1986 Asian Games